Shows as He Goes was a native American chief, most likely Apsaroke (Crow).

Shows as He Goes had several battles with the US cavalry on the Great Plains, fighting for his tribe's independence against the United States, whose pioneers and soldiers were heading in that direction. Even though he managed to become a legend, by 1905 when he met photographer Edward S. Curtis, he was an old relic of the great age of the forts and frontiers. He was one of many people in Curtis' 1900s gallery of natives, whose days in the Indian wars were long behind them.

Crow people
Native American leaders
19th-century Native Americans
20th-century Native Americans
Year of birth missing
Year of death missing